Charles Bruce Brownson (February 5, 1914 – August 4, 1988) was an American World War II veteran who served four terms as a U.S. Representative from Indiana from 1951 to 1959.

Biography
Born in Jackson, Michigan, Brownson moved with his parents to Flint, Michigan, in 1916. He attended public schools. He graduated from the University of Michigan at Ann Arbor in 1935. He entered Infantry Reserve training in 1935. He moved to Indianapolis, Indiana, in October 1936 and established the Central Wallpaper & Paint Corp.

World War II 
Brownson entered active duty as a first lieutenant Infantry Reserve, February 10, 1941. He served as Assistant Chief of Staff, G-1, Eighty-third Infantry Division, in 1943, then as Executive officer to Assistant Chief of Staff G-1, First Army, during invasion planning in England and combat in Europe until V-E Day, and then transferred with First Army Planning Headquarters to Canlubang, Philippine Islands, August 5, 1945. He was released from active duty February 27, 1946, as a lieutenant colonel, Army Reserve, and retired as a colonel in 1974. He was awarded the Legion of Merit, Bronze Star Medal, and French Medaille de Reconnaissance. He served as chairman of the Marion County Juvenile Court Advisory Council in 1948 and 1949.

American Legion
He was an active member of The American Legion and belonged to John H. Holliday, Jr. American Legion Post 186 in Indianapolis.  He was elected as the 33rd Commander of the Department of Indiana's 11th District, encompassing all of Marion County-including Indianapolis, serving from the time of his election in the summer of 1949 until his declaration as a candidate for the United States Congress in 1950.

Congress 
Brownson was elected as a Republican to the Eighty-second and to the three succeeding Congresses (January 3, 1951 – January 3, 1959) representing Indiana's 11th Congressional District. Brownson voted in favor of the Civil Rights Act of 1957. He was an unsuccessful candidate for reelection in 1958 to the Eighty-sixth Congress.

Later career and death 
Brownson served as assistant administrator for public affairs and congressional liaison, Housing and Home Finance Agency, Washington, D.C. from 1959 to 1964. He was editor and publisher of Congressional Staff Directory. He engaged in public relations in Washington, D.C. from 1961 to 1985.
He was a resident of Coral Gables, Florida, and Mount Vernon, Virginia, until his death in Alexandria, Virginia, on August 4, 1988. He was interred in Arlington National Cemetery.

References

External links
Charles Bruce Brownson entry at The Political Graveyard
 
 

1914 births
1988 deaths
American Presbyterians
Burials at Arlington National Cemetery
People from Coral Gables, Florida
Politicians from Jackson, Michigan
Politicians from Indianapolis
Recipients of the Legion of Merit
United States Army colonels
University of Michigan Law School alumni
20th-century American politicians
People from Mount Vernon, Virginia
United States Army personnel of World War II
Military personnel from Michigan
Republican Party members of the United States House of Representatives from Indiana